North Plato is an unincorporated community in Kane County, Illinois, United States, located directly northwest of Plato Center. It is about equidistant between Hampshire and Plato Center. The center of the community is located exactly near the intersection of Plank Road and Illinois Route 47.

References

Unincorporated communities in Kane County, Illinois
Unincorporated communities in Illinois